Grand Manan is a civil parish in Charlotte County, New Brunswick, Canada, comprising one village and one local service district (LSD), both of which are members of the Southwest New Brunswick Service Commission (SNBSC). The parish includes Grand Manan Island and numerous lesser islands, only one of which has permanent year-round inhabitants.

Confusion is sometimes caused by other uses of the name: epenthesis of Grand Manan Island to Grand Manan; the village of Grand Manan; the census subdivision of Grand Manan Parish, which includes only White Head Island; and the assumption of an LSD with the name of Grand Manan, which never existed.

Origin of name
The parish takes its name from Grand Manan Island, which is often shortened to Grand Manan. Ganong gives the origin of the island's name as Mun-aa-nook', his transcription of the locative form of the Passamaquoddy word for island, combined with the French adjective grand used on some early French maps of the area.

History
The parish was erected in 1816 from West Isles Parish as Grand-Manan, to include "Grand-Manan with its appurtenances".

The hyphen was dropped from the name in 1850 and appurtenances was clarified in 1877, implicitly adding Machias Seal Island to the parish.

Boundaries
Grand Manan Parish includes the main island and all islands to the south and west.

Municipality
The village of Grand Manan was formed in 1995 and includes all of the parish except White Head Island.

Local service district
White Head Island comprises only that island.

The LSD was established in 1979 to assess for fire protection, making it the last inhabited part of the parish to become part of a village or LSD.

Today the LSD assesses for only the basic LSD services of fire protection, police services, land use planning, emergency measures, and dog control. The taxing authority is 521.00 White Head Island.

Former villages and local service districts
Before 1995 Grand Manan Island comprised three villages and two LSDs. Running clockwise from the northern end of the island, these were:
 North Head (village)
 Castalia (LSD)
 Woodwards Cove (LSD)
 Grand Harbour (village)
 Seal Cove (village)

Communities
Communities within the parish. all communities except White Head are part of the village of Grand Manan

 Castalia
 Grand Harbour
 Ingalls Head
 Rocky Corner
 Seal Cove
 Tattons Corner
 White Head
 Woodwards Cove

Bodies of water
Bodies of water within the parish.

 Eel Lake
 Little Lake
 Bay of Fundy
 Long Island Bay
 Long Pond Bay
 Dark Harbour
 Grand Harbour
 Little Dark Harbour
 Three Island Harbour
 Wood Island Harbour
 Cheney Passage
 Grand Manan Channel
 The Thoroughfare

Islands
Islands within the parish.

 Cheney Island
 Grand Manan Island
 Great Duck Island
 Hay Island
 High Duck Island
 Kent Island
 Long Island
 Low Duck Island
 Machias Seal Island
 Nantucket Island
 North Green Island
 Outer Wood Island
 Pumpkin Islet
 Rock Island
 Ross Island
 Sheep Island
 South Green Island
 West Pumpkin Island
 Western Green Island
 White Head Island
 White Horse Islet
 Wood Island
 numerous officially named rocks and ledges

Other notable places
Parks, historic sites, and other noteworthy places within the parish.
 Castalia Provincial Park
 Grand Manan Airport
 High Duck Island Protected Natural Area
 North and South Green Islands Protected Natural Area
 The Anchorage Provincial Park
 Western Green Island Protected Natural Area

Census data
Population totals do not include the village of Grand Manan

Population

Language

Notes

References

Parishes of Charlotte County, New Brunswick